Heinz Schnackertz (1911–1990) was a German cinematographer.

Selected filmography
 Liberated Hands (1939)
 In the Temple of Venus (1948)
 My Wife's Friends (1949)
 A Heart Beats for You (1949)
 Love on Ice (1950)
 The Violin Maker of Mittenwald (1950)
 Roses Bloom on the Moorland (1952)
 Heartbroken on the Moselle (1953)
 Fear (1954)
 A Girl from Paris (1954)
 André and Ursula (1955)
 The Beggar Student (1956)
 San Salvatore (1956)
 The Winemaker of Langenlois (1957)
 The Scarlet Baroness (1959)
 The White Horse Inn (1960)
 Do Not Send Your Wife to Italy (1960)
 Isola Bella (1961)
 I Must Go to the City (1962)

References

Bibliography 
 Sidney Gottlieb. Roberto Rossellini's Rome Open City. Cambridge University Press, 2004.

External links 
 

1911 births
1990 deaths
Film people from Cologne
German cinematographers